Baadraan Tehran Football Club (Bashgah-e Futbal-e Badran Tehran), commonly known as Baadraan, is an Iranian football club based in Tehran, that competes in the Azadegan League. The club was founded in 2015.

The football team plays their home games at the Kargaran Stadium which has a capacity of 5,000. The club is owned and supported by the Baadraan Gostar Company.

History

Establishment
The club was founded by the Baadraan Gostar Company on 1 July 2015. They played their first year in League 2. Baadraan finished third in that season.

Azadegan League
After playing one season in League 2 the club showed interest for buying the licence of Naft Tehran in Persian Gulf Pro League. However Baadraan bought the licence of Parseh Tehran in Azadegan League in June 2016.

Stadium

The football team played their home games in their first season at the Vezarat Kar Stadium which has a seating capacity of 5,000. Since July 2016 Baadraan plays their home games at the Kargaran Stadium which has a capacity of 5,000. The stadium was formerly used by Parseh Tehran. Baadraan played also some home matches in the 2016–17 Azadegan League season at Ekbatan.

Seasons
The table below chronicles the achievements of Baadraan in various competitions since 2015.

Notes:The Persian Gulf Pro League was formerly known as Iran Pro League (IPL) and Persian Gulf Cup (PGC)  The Azadegan League was the highest league between 1991 and 2001  The League 2 was formerly known as Iran Football's 2nd Division  The League 3 was formerly known as Iran Football's 3rd Division

Players

First team squad

For recent transfers, see List of Iranian football transfers summer 2016''.

Coaches

Coaches since 2015

Sponsorship

See also
 2016–17 Azadegan League

References

2015 establishments in Iran
Football clubs in Tehran
Association football clubs established in 2015